Paragonah is a town in Iron County, Utah, United States. The population was 488 at the 2010 census.

Demographics

As of the census of 2000, there were 470 people, 156 households, and 122 families residing in the town. The population density was 810.2 people per square mile (312.9/km2). There were 197 housing units at an average density of 339.6 per square mile (131.1/km2). The racial makeup of the town was 98.09% White, 0.21% African American, 0.21% Native American, 0.21% Pacific Islander, 0.64% from other races, and 0.64% from two or more races. Hispanic or Latino of any race were 1.49% of the population.

There were 156 households, out of which 37.8% had children under the age of 18 living with them, 71.8% were married couples living together, 5.1% had a female householder with no husband present, and 21.2% were non-families.19.9% of all households were made up of individuals, and 12.2% had someone living alone who was 65 years of age or older. The average household size was 3.01, and the average family size was 3.52.

In the town, the population was spread out, with 33.8% under the age of 18, 8.3% from 18 to 24, 22.1% from 25 to 44, 20.9% from 45 to 64, and 14.9% who were 65 years of age or older. The median age was 34 years. For every 100 females, there were 101.7 males. For every 100 females age 18 and over, there were 96.8 males.

The median income for a household in the town was $33,958, and the median income for a family was $37,083. Males had a median income of $25,208 versus $21,563 for females. The per capita income for the town was $11,352. About 8.8% of families and 13.9% of the population were below the poverty line, including 17.2% of those under age 18 and none of those age 65 or over.

Geography
Interstate 15 passes northwest of the town, with access from Exit 82.

History
Paragonah was settled by residents from the nearby town of Parowan in the early 1850s. Parowan residents found meadows next to Red Creek that provided ideal locations for farming. The settlement was first known as Red Creek, but the name was later changed to Paragoonah and then Paragonah. There are conflicting sources as to the name's precise meaning, but it is of Southern Paiute origin and apparently is a reference to the red color of the water found in the area. Paragonah was incorporated as a town in 1916.

See also

 List of cities and towns in Utah

References

Sources
 Seegmiller, Janet Burton, A History of Iron County (1998)

External links

Towns in Iron County, Utah
Towns in Utah
Populated places established in 1851
1851 establishments in Utah Territory